See also 2000 in birding and ornithology, main events of 2001, other specialist lists of events in 2001 and 2002 in birding and ornithology.

Worldwide

New species

See also Bird species new to science described in the 2000s

 The Bukidnon woodcock from the Philippines is described as new to science in the journal Forktail

 To be completed

Taxonomic developments
 To be completed

Europe

Britain

Breeding birds
To be completed

Migrant and wintering birds
 Record-breaking numbers of rose-coloured starling reach Britain.

Rare birds
 Britain's first red-billed tropicbird is photographed at sea off the Isles of Scilly in June.
 A grey catbird on Anglesey in October is the first for Britain.
 Britain's first snowy egret is found in Argyll in November, and remains in southwestern Scotland, touring a variety of locations, throughout much of 2002
 A green heron (Britain's fourth) is found in Lincolnshire in September

Other Events
 The British Birdwatching Fair has eastern Cuba as its theme for the year.

Scandinavia
To be completed

North America
To be completed

Asia

Japan
 In late August, a juvenile Calidris sandpiper is found in Japan which appears to be of the hybrid form known as Cox's sandpiper, only the second time this plumage has been recorded

References

Birding and ornithology
Bird
Birding and ornithology by year